The Chapel of the Centurion is the oldest continually used wooden military structure for religious services in the United States.  It is located inside Fort Monroe, a former military installation located in Hampton, Virginia.  The Chapel is named for Cornelius the Centurion, who is believed to be the first Gentile to convert to Christianity.

History 
Construction of the chapel began in 1856 and it was consecrated on May 3, 1858. It was designed by architect, Richard Upjohn, in the Carpenter Gothic style. Fort Monroe is no longer an active Army post.

It was individually listed on the National Register of Historic Places in 2011.

Current 
The Chapel had an active congregation and On March 25, 2012, Lucious B. Morton was installed as the first civilian and first permanent pastor of the Centurion Interdenominational Church.

See also
United States Army Chaplain Corps

References

External links
Chapel of the Centurion website
Fort Monroe, Chapel of the Centurion, Off Ruckman Road, Hampton, Hampton, VA: 15 photos, 4 color transparencies, 3 measured drawings, 10 data pages, and 2 photo caption pages at Historic American Buildings Survey

Historic American Buildings Survey in Virginia
Properties of religious function on the National Register of Historic Places in Virginia
Churches in Hampton, Virginia
Military chapels of the United States
Churches completed in 1858
19th-century churches in the United States
Richard Upjohn church buildings
National Register of Historic Places in Hampton, Virginia
Historic district contributing properties in Virginia
Carpenter Gothic church buildings in Virginia
Military facilities on the National Register of Historic Places in Virginia
1858 establishments in Virginia